Kercheval is an unincorporated community in Clay Township, Spencer County, in the U.S. state of Indiana.

History
A post office was established at Kercheval in 1882, and remained in operation until 1904. The community bears the name of the Kercheval family of settlers.

Geography

References

Unincorporated communities in Spencer County, Indiana
Unincorporated communities in Indiana